The Man in the Black Derby is a 1960 Swiss comedy film directed by Karl Suter. It features the film debut of Bruno Ganz, who played a hotel employee.

Cast
 Walter Roderer as Hugo Wiederkehr
 Sabine Sesselmann as Christine Meißen
 Gustav Knuth as Generaldirektor Meißen
 Charles Regnier as Herr von Seelisberg

References

External links
 

1960 films
1960 comedy films
Swiss comedy films
1960s German-language films
Films directed by Karl Suter